The Books Are My Bag Readers' Awards are annual literary awards presented by the Booksellers Association in the UK and Ireland since 2016. They are sponsored by National Book Tokens.

History and administration
The awards were launched at the 2016 Booksellers Association conference with the aim of being the first literary awards voted for by the public. A shortlist of books are voted for by bookshops who are members of the Booksellers Association, and the winner of each category is chosen by an online public vote, with over 40,000 people voting in the 2017 awards. The ceremony takes place in November in Foyles bookshop in London.  

In 2016, the awards are presented in seven categories of Fiction, Non-Fiction, Biography & Autobiography, Children's, Beautiful Book, Breakthrough Author and Readers' Choice.

In 2017, there are three more categories presented which are Novel, Young Adult and Middle Grade.

Shortlist and winners

References

British literary awards
English-language literary awards
Awards established in 2016